The Keenen Ivory Wayans Show is a late night syndicated television talk show hosted by Keenen Ivory Wayans. The show premiered August 4, 1997, and was cancelled in March 1998. The show had an opening monologue and comedy sketches. His in-house band was an all-female band called Ladies of the Night. In many markets, the show was compared with and competed against the talk show Vibe, which launched at the same time. The two shows would poke fun of each other on occasion.

Guests who appeared on the show include Rick James, Jada Pinkett Smith, Samuel L. Jackson, Nicollette Sheridan, Mark Linn-Baker as well as Whitney Houston and music groups the Foo Fighters, Bone Thugs-N-Harmony and The Firm.

In a 2013 interview by the Television Academy Foundation, Wayans expressed displeasure working on the show as he was not given complete creative freedom. His involvement on the show is often teased by his siblings.

See also 
List of late night network TV programs
Shauna Garr
Terrance Dean

References

External links
 

First-run syndicated television programs in the United States
1990s American variety television series
1997 American television series debuts
1998 American television series endings
1990s American television talk shows
Television series by Disney–ABC Domestic Television